Police is a 1985 French romantic neo noir crime drama film directed by Maurice Pialat and starring Gérard Depardieu, Sophie Marceau, and Sandrine Bonnaire. Written by Catherine Breillat, the film is about a moody, jaded police detective investigating a drug ring who falls for a mysterious woman and is drawn into a shady and dangerous scheme. The film had 1,830,970 admissions in France.

Plot
In the Belleville district of Paris, the widowed Mangin is a cynical and tough police detective working to smash a drug ring of Tunisian brothers. He arrests and brutally interrogates Noria, the girlfriend of one of the gang who is in jail. Though she gives him no useful information, her beauty and her tears touch his heart. She agrees to go with him in a foursome to a disco.

When another gang member is in hospital with knife wounds, he gives Noria the key to his hideout. There she finds a bag of money and heroin, which she removes. When the remaining gang members put heavy pressure on Noria, who denies all knowledge of the theft, she offers herself to Mangin. He is happy to accept her as a lover, even a partner, but says she will not live long if she does not gives back the cash and the drugs.

She fetches the bag for Mangin, who takes it to the bar where the Tunisians hang out. They are delighted, promising to help him in return. Though he has done this to save Noria's life, and has declared his love for her, she leaves him.

Cast
 Gérard Depardieu as Louis Vincent Mangin
 Sophie Marceau as Noria
 Richard Anconina as Lambert
 Pascale Rocard as Marie Vedret
 Sandrine Bonnaire as Lydie
 Frank Karoui as René
 Jonathan Leïna as Simon
 Jacques Mathou as Gauthier
 Bernard Fuzellier as Nez cassé
 Bentahar Meaachou as Claude
 Yann Dedet as Dédé
 Artus de Penguern as Inspector

Accolades
The film was nominated for a César for Best Editing in 1986, as well as a Best Actor nomination for Depardieu. Depardieu also won the Award for Best Actor from the Venice Film Festival in 1985 for his performance of the conflicted Mangin.

References

External links
 
 

1985 films
Neo-noir
French neo-noir films
French crime drama films
1980s French-language films
Films directed by Maurice Pialat
Romantic crime films